Major League Baseball records are the superlative statistics of Major League Baseball (MLB). These include:

 List of Major League Baseball career records
 List of Major League Baseball single-season records
 List of Major League Baseball single-game records
 List of Major League Baseball records considered unbreakable